P. Kannan ( – 16 September 2016) was an Indian politician and former Member of Parliament elected from Tamil Nadu. He was elected to the Lok Sabha as an All India Anna Dravida Munnetra Kazhagam candidate from Salem constituency in 1977 election, and from Tiruchengode constituency in 1984 election. He died at the age of 77 in 2016.

References 

1930s births
2016 deaths
All India Anna Dravida Munnetra Kazhagam politicians
India MPs 1977–1979
India MPs 1984–1989
Lok Sabha members from Tamil Nadu
People from Salem district
People from Namakkal district